Jun Chong is a South Korean martial artist, filmmaker, and actor.

Life and martial arts
Jun Chong was born in 1944 in South Korea. At the age of eight, he began training in the country's national martial art of Taekwondo. While he won numerous competitions both nationally and internationally, Chong decided to try his hand at train in other forms of martial arts, including Hapkido, Judo, Aikido, and Boxing. Chong is currently a 9th-degree grandmaster in Taekwondo and after emigrating to Los Angeles in the 1970s, he opened his own school, which continues to operate today. He has had his share of celebrity students, including Phillip Rhee, Simon Rhee, Lorenzo Lamas, Sam J. Jones, boxing legend Sugar Ray Leonard, and Heather Graham.

Chong is also the founder of the World United Martial Arts Organization (WUMAO), connecting martial arts schools from all over the world to support in the advancement and growth of martial arts.

Film career

Chong made his film debut in 1976 in a South Korean-made martial arts film shot on location in Los Angeles entitled Visitor of America, with Chong being credited as 케리・郑 (Ke-li Chong) in the original Korean version and as Bruce K.L. Lea in the English-dubbed and altered U.S. edit known as Bruce Lee Fights Back from the Grave.

In 1985, Chong founded his own production company, Action Brothers Productions. His first film as a producer and star was L.A. Street Fighters, also known as Ninja Turf. The film would include some of Chong's students as cast members as well as martial arts legend Bill Wallace and a pre-fame Thomas F. Wilson of the Back to the Future trilogy. His second film, Silent Assassins, had Chong team up with real-life student Sam J. Jones and Linda Blair. The film also had a brief fight scene between real-life brothers Phillip Rhee and Simon Rhee, who play a good guy and an assassin respectively. In 1990, Chong starred, produced, and choreographed the fight scenes for Street Soldiers, which he plays the martial arts teacher of a high school gang who want to take back the streets from a rival and more ruthless street gang. The film would mark the only Hollywood film from Korean-born martial arts film star Hwang Jang-Lee, who fought Chong in the film. After this film, Chong took a fifteen-year hiatus from films to focus on teaching.

Chong returned in 2006 in the role of Master Chong in the mixed martial arts film Maximum Cage Fighting, which he also produced under his Action Brothers Entertainment. In 2015, he made a cameo appearance as himself in the comeback film for Phillip Rhee, Underdog Kids as a judge alongside fellow martial arts legends Richard Norton, Don Wilson, Benny Urquidez, and Dan Inosanto.

External links

1944 births
Living people
South Korean male film actors
South Korean male martial artists